Young-Luv.com is the second extended play by South Korean girl group STAYC. It was released by High Up Entertainment on February 21, 2022, and contains six tracks, including the lead single "Run2U".

Background and release
On January 28, 2022, High Up Entertainment announced STAYC would be releasing a new album in February 2022. On February 8, it was announced STAYC would be releasing their second extended play Young-Luv.com on February 21. On February 16, the music video teaser for lead single "Run2U" was released. A day later, the highlight medley video teaser, together with the track listing, was released. The album was released on February 21.

Promotion
Prior to the extended play's release, on February 21, 2022, STAYC held a live showcase on YouTube to introduce the extended play and communicate with their fans.

Commercial performance
Young-Luv.com debuted at number one on South Korean's Gaon Album Chart in the chart issue dated February 20–26, 2022; on the monthly chart, the extended play debuted at number two in the chart issue dated February 2022 with 212,211 copies sold. In Japan, the extended play debuted at number 44 on the Oricon Albums Chart in the chart issue dated March 14, 2022.

Track listing

Credits and personnel
Credits adapted from Melon.

Studio
 Ingrid Studio – recording, digital editing
 Koko Sound Studio – mixing
 Metropolis Mastering Studios – mastering

Personnel
 STAYC – vocals , background vocals 
 STAYC (Sieun) – background vocals 
 Jeon Goon – background vocals , lyrics , composition 
 FLYT – background vocals , composition , arrangement , keyboard , bass , drums , piano 
 Rado – background vocals , arrangement , drums , bass , keyboard 
 B.E.P – lyrics , composition 
 BXN – lyrics, composition, arrangement 
 will.b – lyrics, composition, arrangement, bass, MIDI programming 
 Prime Time – composition 
 van.gogh – composition 
 Jung Eun-kyung – recording, digital editing 
 DRK – mixing 
 Kim Jun-sang – mixing (assistant) 
 Kim Min-woo – mixing (assistant) 
 Stuart Hawkes – mastering 
 Jwa Haeng-seog – drums 
 Lee Gil-chan – keyboard 
 Byeon Mu-hyeog – piano

Charts

Weekly charts

Monthly charts

Year-end charts

Certifications and sales

Release history

References

2022 EPs
Korean-language EPs
STAYC albums